13th Troop Carrier Squadron may refer to:
 The 913th Air Refueling Squadron, designated the 13th Troop Carrier Squadron from July 1942 to October 1946. 
 The 13th Reconnaissance Squadron, designated the 13th Troop Carrier Squadron, Medium from June 1952 to April 1953.